Tibet under Qing rule refers to the Qing dynasty's relationship with Tibet from 1720 to 1912. The political status of Tibet during this period has been the subject of political debate. The Qing called Tibet a fanbang or fanshu, which has usually been translated as "vassal state." Chinese authorities referred to Tibet as a vassal state up until the 1950s and then as an "integral" part of China. The de facto independent Tibetan government (1912–1951) and Tibetan exiles promote the status of independent nation with only a "priest and patron" relationship between the Dalai Lama and the Qing emperor. Western historians such as Melvyn Goldstein, Elliot Sperling, and Jaques Gernet have described Tibet during the Qing period as a protectorate, vassal state, tributary, or something similar.

By 1642, Güshi Khan of the Khoshut Khanate had reunified Tibet under the spiritual and temporal authority of the 5th Dalai Lama of the Gelug school. In 1653, the Dalai Lama travelled on a state visit to the Qing court, and was received in Beijing and "recognized as the spiritual authority of the Qing Empire". The Dzungar Khanate invaded Tibet in 1717 and was subsequently expelled by the Qing in 1720. The Qing emperors then appointed imperial residents known as ambans to Tibet, most of them ethnic Manchus that reported to the Lifan Yuan, a Qing government body that oversaw the empire's frontier. During the Qing era, Lhasa was politically semi-autonomous under the Dalai Lamas. Qing authorities at times engaged in political acts of intervention in Tibet, collected tribute, stationed troops, and influenced reincarnation selection through the Golden Urn. About half of the Tibetan lands were exempted from Lhasa's administrative rule and annexed into neighboring Chinese provinces, although most were only nominally subordinated to Beijing.

By the late 19th century, Chinese hegemony over Tibet only existed in theory. In 1890, the Qing and Britain signed the Anglo-Chinese Convention Relating to Sikkim and Tibet, which Tibet disregarded since it was for "Lhasa alone to negotiate with foreign powers on Tibet's behalf". The British concluded in 1903 that Chinese suzerainty over Tibet was a "constitutional fiction", and proceeded to invade Tibet in 1903–04. However in the 1907 Anglo-Russian Convention, Britain and Russia recognized the Qing as suzerain of Tibet and pledged to abstain from Tibetan affairs, thus fixing the suzerainty status in an international document. The Qing began taking steps to reassert control, then invaded Tibet and occupied Lhasa in 1910. After the Qing dynasty was overthrown during the Xinhai revolution of 1911, the amban delivered a letter of surrender to the 13th Dalai Lama in the summer of 1912. The 13th Dalai Lama returned to Lhasa in 1913 and ruled an independent Tibet until his death in 1933.

Political status

The political status of Tibet during the Qing period has been described as a "Chinese protectorate," a "Qing protectorate," a "Manchu protectorate," a "subordinate place... within the Qing Empire," a "part of an empire," a "vassal state," a "dependent state," and a "tributary or a dependency," Tibet was referred to by the Qing as a fanbang or fanshu, which has usually been translated as "vassal state."  As a fanshu it fell under the jurisdiction of the Lifan Yuan, which also oversaw Mongolia. According to Jaques Gernet, the Qing gained a firm hold over Tibet in 1751, although as a protectorate, Tibet retained a large amount of internal authority. Elliot Sperling says that after the Sino-Nepalese War (1788-1789), Tibet's subordination to the Qing was "beyond dispute" and that one of the memoirs of a Tibetan minister involved in the war states unambiguously that he was a subject of the Qing emperor. The Golden Urn system of selecting reincarnations was instituted by the Qing and real authority over Tibet was wielded by its offices and officials. However for most of the 19th century this authority was weak. After the death of the 8th Dalai Lama, Jamphel Gyatso in 1804, the Dalai Lamas did not exercise any real power for the next 70 years, during which monk regents reigned with the support of the Qing. In terms of foreign recognition, Britain and Russia formally acknowledged Chinese authority over Tibet in treaties of 1906 and 1907. This was after the 1904 British expedition to Tibet stirred China into becoming more directly involved in Tibetan affairs and working to integrate Tibet with "the rest of China." In 1910, the Qing reasserted control over Tibet by occupying Lhasa and deposing the 13th Dalai Lama. The Qing dynasty was overthrown in the Xinhai revolution the next year and the Republic of China lacked the ability to continue the occupation. The 13th Dalai Lama returned to Lhasa in 1913 and ruled an independent Tibet until his death in 1933.

There are varying interpretations of the patron and priest relationship, a Tibetan political theory that the relationship between Tibet and China was a symbiotic link between a spiritual leader and a lay patron, such as the relationship between the Dalai Lama and the Qing emperor. They were respectively spiritual teacher and lay patron rather than subject and lord. Chöyön is an abbreviation of two Tibetan words: chöney, "that which is worthy of being given gifts and alms" (for example, a lama or a deity), and yöndag, "he who gives gifts to that which is worthy" (a patron). During the 1913 Simla Conference, the 13th Dalai Lama's negotiators cited the priest and patron relationship to explain the lack of any clearly demarcated boundary between Tibet and the rest of China (ie. as a religious benefactor, the Qing did not need to be hedged against). 

There are also different interpretations of titles and symbolic gestures between Tibetan and Qing authorities. The 13th Dalai Lama, for example, knelt, but did not kowtow, before the Empress Dowager Cixi and the young Emperor while he delivered his petition in Beijing.  Chinese sources emphasize the submission of kneeling; Tibetan sources emphasize the lack of the kowtow.  Titles and commands given to Tibetans by the Chinese, likewise, are variously interpreted. The Qing authorities gave the 13th Dalai Lama the title of "Loyally Submissive Vice-Regent", and ordered to follow Qing commands and communicate with the emperor only through the Manchu amban in Lhasa; but opinions vary as to whether these titles and commands reflected actual political power, or symbolic gestures ignored by Tibetans. Some authors claim that kneeling before the Emperor followed the 17th-century precedent in the case of the 5th Dalai Lama. Other historians indicate that the emperor treated the Dalai Lama as an equal. 

According to Sperling, the description of a "priest-patron" religious relationship governing Sino-Tibetan relations that excluded concrete political subordination is a recent phenomenon and not substantiated. The priest and patron relationship coexisted with Tibet's political subordination to the Yuan and Qing dynasties, despite Tibetan exile commentators having come to believe that this political subordination was a misunderstanding. Sperling describes this as a "cultural notion at work as a national idea is defined anew." Tibetan interaction with the West, assimilation of modern ideals about Tibet, and the goal of cultural preservation increasingly centered discussion of Tibet around its religious and spiritual significance. This impetus to formulate a Tibetan identity based primarily on religion has made understanding the political realities of Tibet's relationship to the Yuan and Qing dynasties difficult.

Government

Regent
From 1721 to 1727, Tibet was governed by Khangchenné, who led the Tibetan cabinet known as the Kashag. From 1728 to 1750, Tibet was a monarchy led by the princes or kings Polhané Sönam Topgyé and Gyurme Namgyal. The regents of Tibet after 1727 were recognized by the Chinese as wang (prince) but as "king" by European missionaries. Both Polhané and Gyurme were de facto rulers of Tibet who exercised power in their own name and authority without reference to the Dalai Lama. Their post was hereditary. The Kashag was merely an executive organ and provincial administration was controlled by the nominees of the rulers. Compulsory transport service was a monopoly of the regent. Qing supervision was nominal and restricted only to external relations. After 1750, the hereditary office was abolished, and regents (gyeltsap) became temporary offices again. They managed the government before the Dalai Lama reached the age of majority in his 18th year.

Dalai Lama
When the Qing dynasty installed the 7th Dalai Lama in 1720, his religious supremacy was recognized by the Tibetan government, but the Qing ignored his theoretical rights. After 1720, the government was appointed by the Qing but due to distance and bad organization, was largely independent. After the civil war of 1727/8, the 7th Dalai Lama was suspected of complicity in the murder of Khangchenné, who led the Tibetan cabinet, and was exiled to Gartar Monastery in Kham. All temporal authority was wielded by Polhané Sönam Topgyé in the meantime. After the events of 1750 in which the 7th Dalai Lama managed to quell the riots caused by the death of Polhané's successor at the hands of the ambans, the Yongzheng Emperor gave tacit recognition to the rights of the Dalai Lama to the sovereignty of Tibet. The right was not formally sanctioned but was taken as granted. The 7th Dalai Lama then conducted government with some degree of control by the Qing.

According to The Veritable Records of the Shizong [Yongzheng] Emperor and in the Weizang tuzhi [ Topographical Description of Central Tibet ], the Dalai Lama's powers after 1751 included overseeing important decisions by ministers and appointing district governors, provincial governors, and officers based on the recommendations of the council with the approval of the ambans.

The 8th, 9th, 10th, 11th, and 12th Dalai Lamas from 1758 to 1875 were unimportant or died young. The 13th Dalai Lama (1875-1933) fled to Urga during the British occupation of Lhasa in 1904. With the resulting treaty in 1906 recognizing China's suzerainty over Tibet, the 13th Dalai Lama visited Beijing in 1908 where he tried unsuccessfully to gain a greater degree of independence for Tibet. The Qing occupied Lhasa in 1910 and the 13th Dalai Lama fled to India. The Qing dynasty fell the next year and its forces withdrew from Tibet. In 1913, the 13th Dalai Lama returned to Lhasa and declared himself sovereign of an independent Tibet which he ruled until his death in 1933.

Kashag
The Kashag was a council of four ministers called kalön. The council existed between 1642 and 1705/6 but very little is known about its activity. Under Lha-bzang Khan the Kashag had little power and was composed of only Mongols to the exclusion of Tibetans. In 1721, the Kashag was renewed by the Qing as the head of state in Tibet with loose Qing supervision. Its members were composed of Tibetan nobles whose territorial ambitions soon caused the council to stop functioning, resulting in civil war in 1727/8. The council was reconstituted again in 1728 as the executive organ of the regent. Each kalön was directly responsible to the "king". In the latter part of Polhané's reign they ceased to have meetings. In 1751, the council was reconstituted as a collective administration where all decisions were to be taken only with common agreement.

Amban
The office of the two Ambans was set up in 1728. Prior to that there were no permanent representatives of the Qing emperor in Tibet and the temporary representative after 1720 was withdrawn in 1723. Between 1723 and 1728, there were special missions to Lhasa but no permanent residence. There was a senior and junior amban but the distinction was purely formal and they both held the same authority. Between the death of A'erxun in 1734 and 1748, there was only one amban. The first two ambans, Sengge and Mala, held office for five years, but thereafter ambans held office for a maximum of three years. During the rule of Polhané, the ambans' duties mainly consisted of commanding the Qing garrison and communications with Beijing on the actions of the Tibetan ruler. Sometimes they intervened in matters of foreign relations but they never interfered with the Tibetan government. In 1751, the power of the ambans was increased. Besides their former duties, their advice also had to be taken by the Kashag on every important matter, giving them broad supervision over the Tibetan government. Direct intervention by the ambans was still a rare occurrence until after the Sino-Nepalese War in 1792. The staff of the ambans included one or two military officers and several clerics. The clerics' function was probably similar to that of secretaries. After 1751, a number of Manchu banner officers were added.

History

1641-1717 

Güshi Khan of the Khoshut in 1641 overthrew the prince of Tsang and helped reunite the regions of Tibet under the 5th Dalai Lama as the highest spiritual and political authority in Tibet. A governing body known as the Ganden Phodrang was established, while Güshi Khan remained personally devoted to the Dalai Lama.

In 1653, the Dalai Lama travelled to Beijing on a state visit, and was received as an equal to the Qing Emperor. At that time, the Dalai Lama was "recognized as the spiritual authority of the Qing Empire", and the "priest" relationship with Qing began. The time of the 5th Dalai Lama, also known of as "the Great Fifth", was a period of rich cultural development.

Decades earlier, Hongtaiji, the founder of the Qing dynasty, had insulted the Mongols for believing in Tibetan Buddhism.

With Güshi Khan, who founded the Khoshut Khanate as a largely uninvolved overlord, the 5th Dalai Lama conducted foreign policy independently of the Qing, on the basis of his spiritual authority amongst the Mongolians. He acted as a mediator between Mongol tribes, and between the Mongols and the Qing Kangxi Emperor.  The Dalai Lama would assign territories to Mongol tribes, and these decisions were routinely confirmed by the Emperor.

In 1674, the Emperor asked the Dalai Lama to send Mongolian troops to help suppress Wu Sangui's Revolt of the Three Feudatories in Yunnan.  The Dalai Lama refused to send troops, and advised Kangxi to resolve the conflict in Yunnan by dividing China with Wu Sangui. The Dalai Lama openly professed neutrality but he exchanged gifts and letters with Wu Sangui during the war further deepening the Qing's suspicions and angering them against the Dalai Lama. This was apparently a turning point for the Emperor, who began to deal with the Mongols directly, rather than through the Dalai Lama.

The Dalai Lama's Ganden Phodrang government formalized the frontier between Tibet and China in 1677, with Kham ascribed to Tibet's authority.

The 5th Dalai Lama died in 1682. His regent, Desi Sangye Gyatso, concealed his death and continued to act in his name. In 1688, Galdan Boshugtu Khan of the Khoshut defeated the Khalkha Mongols and went on to battle Qing forces. This contributed to the loss of Tibet's role as mediator between the Mongols and the Emperor. Several Khalkha tribes formally submitted directly to Kangxi. Galdan retreated to Dzungaria. When Sangye Gyatso complained to Kangxi that he could not control the Mongols of Kokonor in 1693, Kangxi annexed Kokonor, giving it the name it bears today, Qinghai. He also annexed Tachienlu in eastern Kham at this time. When Kangxi finally destroyed Galdan in 1696, a Qing ruse involving the name of the Dalai Lama was involved; Galdan blamed the Dalai Lama for his ruin, still not aware of his death fourteen years earlier.

About this time, some Dzungars informed the Kangxi Emperor that the 5th Dalai Lama had long since died. He sent envoys to Lhasa to inquire. This prompted Sangye Gyatso to make Tsangyang Gyatso, the 6th Dalai Lama, public. He was enthroned in 1697. Tsangyang Gyatso enjoyed a lifestyle that included drinking, the company of women, and writing poetry In 1702, he refused to take the vows of a Buddhist monk. The regent, under pressure from the Emperor and Lhazang Khan of the Khoshut, resigned in 1703. In 1705, Lhazang Khan used the sixth Dalai Lama's lifestyle as excuse to take control of Lhasa. The regent Sanggye Gyatso, who had allied himself with the Dzungar Khanate, was murdered, and the Dalai Lama was sent to Beijing. He died on the way, near Kokonor, ostensibly from illness but leaving lingering suspicions of foul play.

Lhazang Khan appointed a pretender Dalai Lama who was not accepted by the Gelugpa school. The Dalai Lama's incarnation Kelzang Gyatso, 7th Dalai Lama, was discovered near Kokonor. Three Gelug abbots of the Lhasa area appealed to the Dzungar Khanate, which invaded Tibet in 1717, deposed Lhazang Khan's pretender to the position of Dalai Lama, and killed Lhazang Khan and his entire family. The Dzungars then proceeded to loot, rape and kill throughout Lhasa and its environs.  They also destroyed a small Chinese force in the Battle of the Salween River, which the Emperor had sent to clear traditional trade routes.

Qing forces arrive in Tibet 

In response to the Dzungar occupation of Tibet, a joint force of Tibetans and Chinese, sent by the Kangxi Emperor, responded. The Tibetan forces were under Polhanas (also spelled Polhaney) of central Tsang, and Kangchennas (also spelled Gangchenney), the governor of Western Tibet. The Dzungars were expelled from Tibet in 1720. The Kangxi Emperor's forces brought Kelzang Gyatso with them to Lhasa and he was enthroned as the 7th Dalai Lama.

At that time, a Qing protectorate in Tibet (described by Stein as "sufficiently mild and flexible to be accepted by the Tibetan government") was initiated with a garrison at Lhasa. The area of Kham east of the Dri River (Jinsha River—Upper Yangtze) was annexed to Sichuan in 1726-1727 through a treaty.  In 1721, the Qing expanded their protectorate in Lhasa with a council (the Kashag) of three Tibetan ministers, headed by Kangchennas.  A Khalkha prince was made amban, the official representative of Qing in Tibet.  Another Khalkha directed the military. The Dalai Lama's role at this time may have been purely symbolic in China's eyes, but it wasn't to the Dalai Lama nor to the Ganden Phodrang government or the Tibetan people, who viewed the Qing as a "patron". The Dalai Lama was also still highly influential because of the Mongols' religious beliefs.

The Qing came as patrons of the Khoshut, liberators of Tibet from the Dzungar, and supporters of the Dalai Lama Kelzang Gyatso, but when they tried to replace the Khoshut as rulers of Kokonor and Tibet, they earned the resentment of the Khoshut and also the Tibetans of Kokonor. , a grandson of Güshi Khan, led a rebellion in 1723, when 200,000 Tibetans and Mongols attacked Xining. Central Tibet did not support the rebellion.  Polhanas blocked the rebels' retreat from Qing retaliation. The rebellion was brutally suppressed.

Green Standard Army troops were garrisoned at multiple places such as Lhasa, Batang, Dartsendo, Lhari, Chamdo, and Litang, throughout the Dzungar war. Green Standard troops and Manchu Bannermen were both part of the Qing force that fought in Tibet in the war against the Dzungars. The Sichuan commander Yue Zhongqi (a descendant of Yue Fei) entered Lhasa first when the 2,000 Green Standard soldiers and 1,000 Manchu soldiers of the "Sichuan route" seized Lhasa. According to Mark C. Elliott, after 1728 the Qing used Green Standard troops to man the garrison in Lhasa rather than Bannermen. According to Evelyn S. Rawski, both Green Standard Army and Bannermen made up the Qing garrison in Tibet. According to Sabine Dabringhaus, Green Standard Chinese soldiers numbering more than 1,300 were stationed by the Qing in Tibet to support the 3,000-strong Tibetan army.

1725-1761 
The Kangxi Emperor was succeeded by the Yongzheng Emperor in 1722.  In 1725, amidst a series of Qing transitions reducing Qing forces in Tibet and consolidating control of Amdo and Kham, Kangchennas received the title of Prime Minister. The Emperor ordered the conversion of all Nyingma to Gelug. This persecution created a rift between Polhanas, who had been a Nyingma monk, and Kangchennas.  Both of these officials, who represented Qing interests, were opposed by the Lhasa nobility, who had been allied with the Dzungars and were anti-Qing.  They killed Kangchennas and took control of Lhasa in 1727, and Polhanas fled to his native Ngari.  Polhanas gathered an army and retook Lhasa in July 1728 against opposition from the Lhasa nobility and their allies.

Qing troops arrived in Lhasa in September, and punished the anti-Qing faction by executing entire families, including women and children. The Dalai Lama was sent to Lithang Monastery in Kham. The Panchen Lama was brought to Lhasa and was given temporal authority over central Tsang and western Ngari Prefecture, creating a territorial division between the two high lamas that was to become a long-lasting feature of Chinese policy toward Tibet. Two ambans were established in Lhasa, with increased numbers of Qing troops. Over the 1730s, Qing troops were again reduced, and Polhanas gained more power and authority. The Dalai Lama returned to Lhasa in 1735, but temporal power remained with Polhanas. The Qing found Polhanas to be a loyal agent and an effective ruler over a stable Tibet, so he remained dominant until his death in 1747.

The Qing made the region of Amdo into the province of Qinghai in 1724, and a treaty of 1727 led to the incorporation of eastern Kham into neighbouring Chinese provinces in 1728. The Qing government sent a resident commissioner (amban) to Lhasa. A stone monument regarding the boundary between Tibet and neighbouring Chinese provinces, agreed upon by Lhasa and Beijing in 1726, was placed atop a mountain, and survived into at least the 19th century. This boundary, which was used until 1865, delineated the Dri River in Kham as the frontier between Tibet and Qing China.  Territory east of the boundary was governed by Tibetan chiefs who were answerable to China.

Polhanas' son Gyurme Namgyal took over upon his father's death in 1747. The ambans became convinced that he was going to lead a rebellion, so they assassinated him independently from Beijing's authority. News of the murders leaked out and an uprising broke out in the city during which the residents of Lhasa avenged the regent's death by killing both ambans.

The Dalai Lama stepped in and restored order in Lhasa, while it was thought that further uprisings would result in harsh retaliation from China.  The Qianlong Emperor (Yongzheng's successor) sent a force of 800, which executed Gyurme Namgyal's family and seven members of the group that allegedly killed the ambans.

Temporal power was reasserted by the Dalai Lama in 1750. But the Qing Emperor re-organized the Tibetan government again and appointed new ambans. These ambans or commissioners were not only unable to take charge, they were also kept uninformed. This reduced the post of the Residential Commissioner in Tibet to name only". The number of soldiers in Tibet was kept at about 2,000. The defensive duties were partly helped out by a local force which was reorganized by the amban, and the Tibetan government continued to manage day-to-day affairs as before. The Emperor reorganized the Kashag to have four Kalöns in it. He also used Tibetan Buddhist iconography to try and bolster support among Tibetans, whereby six thangkas portrayed the Qing Emperor as Manjuśrī and Tibetan records of the time referred to him by that name.

The 7th Dalai Lama died in 1757. Afterwards, an assembly of lamas decided to institute the office of regent, to be held by an incarnate lama "until the new Dalai Lama attained his majority and could assume his official duties". The Seventh Demo, Ngawang Jampel Delek Gyatso, was selected unanimously. The 8th Dalai Lama, Jamphel Gyatso, was born in 1758 in Tsang. The Panchen Lama helped in the identification process, while Jampal Gyatso was recognized in 1761, then brought to Lhasa for his enthronement, presided over by the Panchen Lama, in 1762.

1779-1793 

In 1779, the 6th Panchen Lama, fluent also in Hindi and Persian and well disposed to both Catholic missionaries in Tibet and East India Company agents in India, was invited to Peking for the celebration of the Emperor's 70th birthday. The "priest and patron" relationship between Tibet and Qing China was underscored by Emperor prostrating "to his spiritual father".

In 1841, the Hindu Dogra dynasty attempted to establish their authority on Ü-Tsang but were defeated in the Sino-Sikh War (1841–1842).

In the mid-19th century, arriving with an amban, a community of Chinese troops from Sichuan that had married Tibetan women settled down in the Lubu neighborhood of Lhasa, where their descendants established a community and assimilated into Tibetan culture. Another community, Hebalin, was where Chinese Muslim troops and their wives and offspring lived.

In 1879, the 13th Dalai Lama was enthroned, but did not assume full temporal control until 1895, after the National Assembly of the Tibetan Government (tshongs 'du rgyas 'dzom) unanimously called for him to assume power.
Before that time, the British Empire increased their interest in Tibet, and a number of Indians entered the region, first as explorers and then as traders. The British sent a mission with a military escort through Sikkim in 1885, whose entry was refused by Tibet and the British withdrew. Tibet then organized an army to be stationed at the border, led by Dapon Lhading (mda' dpon lha sding, d.u.) and Tsedron Sonam Gyeltsen (rtse mgron bsod nams rgyal mtshan, d.u.) with soldiers from southern Kongpo and those from Kham's Drakyab. At a pass between Sikkim and Tibet, which Tibet considered a part of Tibet, the British attacked in 1888.

Following the attack, the British and Chinese signed the 1890 Anglo-Chinese Convention Relating to Sikkim and Tibet, which Tibet disregarded as it did "all agreements signed between China and Britain regarding Tibet, taking the position that it was for Lhasa alone to negotiate with foreign powers on Tibet's behalf". Qing China and Britain had also concluded an earlier treaty in 1886, the "Convention Relating to Burmah and Thibet" as well as a later treaty in 1893. Regardless of those treaties, Tibet continued to bar British envoys from its territory.

Then in 1896, the Qing Governor of Sichuan attempted to gain control of the Nyarong valley in Kham during a military attack led by Zhou Wanshun. The Dalai Lama circumvented the amban and a secret mission led by Sherab Chonpel (shes rab chos 'phel, d.u.) was sent directly to Beijing with a demand for the withdrawal of Chinese forces. The Qing Guangxu Emperor agreed, and the "territory was returned to the direct rule of Lhasa".

Lhasa, 1900-1909 

At the beginning of the 20th century the British Empire and Russian Empires were competing for supremacy in Central Asia. During "the Great Game", a period of rivalry between Russia and Britain, the British desired a representative in Lhasa to monitor and offset Russian influence.

Years earlier, the Dalai Lama had developed an interest in Russia through his debating partner, Buriyat Lama Agvan Dorjiev. Then in 1901, Dorjiev had delivered letters from Tibet to the Tzar, namely a formal letter of appreciation from the Dalai Lama, and another from the Kashak directly soliciting support against the British. Dorjiev's journey to Russia was seen as a threat by British interests in India, despite Russian statements they would not intervene. After realizing the Qing lacked any real authority in Tibet, a British expedition was dispatched in 1904, officially to resolve border disputes between Tibet and Sikkim. The expedition quickly turned into an invasion which captured Lhasa.

For the first time and in response to the invasion, the Chinese foreign ministry asserted that China was sovereign over Tibet, the first clear statement of such a claim.

Before the British invasion force arrived in Lhasa, the 13th Dalai Lama escaped to seek alliances for Tibet. The Dalai Lama travelled first to Mongolia and requested help from Russia against China and Britain, and learned in 1907 that Britain and Russia signed a non-interference in Tibet agreement. This essentially removed Tibet from the so-called "Great Game". The Dalai Lama received a dispatch from Lhasa, and was about to return there from Amdo in the summer of 1908 when he decided to go Beijing instead, where he was received with a ceremony appropriately "accorded to any independent sovereign", as witnessed by U.S Ambassador to China William Rockwell. Tibetan affairs were discussed directly with Qing Dowager Empress Cixi, then together with the young Emperor. Cixi died in November 1908 during the state visit, and the Dalai Lama performed the funeral rituals. The Dalai Lama also made contacts with Japanese diplomats and military advisors.

The Dalai Lama returned from his search for support against China and Britain to Lhasa in 1909, and initiated reforms to establish a standing Tibetan army while consulting with Japanese advisors. Treaties were signed between the British and the Tibetans, then between China and Britain. The 1904 document was known as the Convention Between Great Britain and Tibet. The main points of the treaty allowed the British to trade in Yadong, Gyantse, and Gartok while Tibet was to pay a large indemnity of 7,500,000 rupees, later reduced by two-thirds, with the Chumbi Valley ceded to Britain until the imdenity was received. Further provisions recognised the Sikkim-Tibet border and prevented Tibet from entering into relations with other foreign powers. As a result, British economic influence expanded further in Tibet, while at the same time Tibet remained under the first claim in 1904 of "sovereignty" by the Qing dynasty of China.

The Anglo-Tibetan treaty was followed by a 1906 Convention Between Great Britain and China Respecting Tibet, by which the "Government of Great Britain engages not to annex Tibetan territory or to interfere in the administration of Tibet. The Government of China also undertakes not to permit any other foreign State to interfere with the territory or internal administration of Tibet." Moreover, Beijing agreed to pay London 2.5 million rupees which Lhasa was forced to agree upon in the Anglo-Tibetan treaty of 1904.

As the Dalai Lama had learned during his travels for support, in 1907 Britain and Russia agreed that in "conformity with the admitted principle of the 1904 suzerainty of China over Tibet", (from 1904), both nations "engage not to enter into negotiations with Tibet except through the intermediary of the Chinese Government."

Qing in Kham, 1904-1911 

Soon after the British invasion of Tibet, the Qing rulers in China were alarmed. They sent the imperial official Feng Quan (凤全) to Kham to begin reasserting Qing control. Feng Quan's initiatives in Kham of land reforms and reductions to the number of monks led to an uprising by monks at a Batang monastery in the Chiefdom of Batang. Tibetan control of the Batang region of Kham in eastern Tibet appears to have continued uncontested following a 1726-1727 treaty. In Batang's uprising, Feng Quan was killed, as were Chinese farmers and their fields were burned.  The British invasion through Sikkim triggered a Khampa reaction, where chieftains attacked and French missionaries, Manchu and Han Qing officials, and Christian converts were killed. French Catholic missionaries Père Pierre-Marie Bourdonnec and Père Jules Dubernard were killed around the Mekong.

In response, Beijing appointed army commander Zhao Erfeng, the Governor of Xining, to "reintegrate" Tibet into China. Known of as "the Butcher of Kham" Zhao was sent in either 1905 or 1908 on a punitive expedition. His troops executed monks destroyed a number of monasteries in Kham and Amdo, and an early form of "sinicization" of the region began. Later, around the time of the collapse of the Qing Dynasty, Zhao's soldiers mutinied and beheaded him.

Program of integration of Tibet to the rest of China (1905-1911) 
From 1905, China temporarily took back the control of Tibet as suzerain power, until the revolution of 1911 which marked the collapse of the Qing Empire and the installation of the Republic of China. After obtaining the departure of the British troops in return for an indemnity payment, the Qing dynasty, although weakened, decided to play a more active role in the conduct of Tibetan affairs. To preserve its interests, it implemented, from 1905 to 1911, a program of integration of Tibet to the rest of China at the political, economic and cultural levels.

Plans were laid to build a railway line connecting Sichuan to Tibet, to form an army of six thousand men and to secularise the Tibetan government by creating non-ecclesiastical governmental commissions. A mint was to be established, roads and telephone lines were to be built and local resources were to be exploited. In Lhasa, a Chinese school opened in 1907 and a military college in 1908.

A Chinese postal service with five post offices was established in central Tibet and the first stamps were issued (with inscriptions in Chinese and Tibetan).

In 1909, a bilingual newspaper, the Vernacular newspaper of Tibet, the first of its kind, was printed in Lhasa on presses imported from Calcutta. It appeared every ten days and each issue was printed in 300 or 400 copies. Its objective, at the same time educational and of propaganda, was to facilitate the administrative reforms engaged by Lian Yu and Zhang Yintang.

This program was however reduced to nothing by the outbreak of the Chinese revolution in 1911, the collapse of the Qing empire and the elimination of Chao Ehr-feng.

For Hsaio-ting Lin, the series of reforms initiated by Chao Ehr-feng can be seen as the first attempt at state-building by modern China in its southwestern marches.

Before the collapse of the Qing Empire, the Swedish explorer Sven Hedin returned in 1909 from a three-year-long expedition to Tibet, having mapped and described a large part of inner Tibet. During his travels, he visited the 9th Panchen Lama. For some of the time, Hedin had to camouflage himself as a Tibetan shepherd (because he was European). In an interview following a meeting with the Russian czar he described the situation in 1909 as follows:
"Currently, Tibet is in the cramp-like hands of China's government. The Chinese realize that if they leave Tibet for the Europeans, it will end its isolation in the East. That is why the Chinese prevent those who wish to enter Tibet. The Dalai Lama is currently also in the hands of the Chinese Government"... "Mongols are fanatics. They adore the Dalai Lama and obey him blindly. If he tomorrow orders them go to war against the Chinese, if he urges them to a bloody revolution, they will all like one man follow him as their ruler. China's government, which fears the Mongols, hooks on to the Dalai Lama."... "There is calm in Tibet. No ferment of any kind is perceptible" (translated from Swedish).

Qing collapse and Tibet independence 
But in February 1910, the Qing General  invaded Tibet during its attempt to gain control of the country. After the Dalai Lama was told he was to be arrested, he escaped from Lhasa to India and remained for three months. Reports arrived of Lhasa's sacking, and the arrests of government officials. He was later informed by letter that Qing China had "deposed" him.

After the Dalai Lama's return to Tibet at a location outside of Lhasa, the collapse of the Qing Dynasty occurred in October 1911. The Qing amban submitted a formal letter of surrender to the Dalai Lama in the summer of 1912.

On 13 February 1913, the Dalai Lama declared Tibet an independent nation, and announced that what he described as the historic "priest and patron relationship" with China had ended. The amban and China's military were expelled, and all Chinese residents in Tibet were given a required departure limit of three years. All remaining Qing forces left Tibet after the Xinhai Lhasa turmoil.

See also
 Tibet under Yuan rule
 Sino-Tibetan relations during the Ming dynasty
 Qing dynasty in Inner Asia
 Manchuria under Qing rule
 Mongolia under Qing rule
 Xinjiang under Qing rule
 Taiwan under Qing rule
 Lifan Yuan
 Dzungar–Qing War
 Ganden Phodrang
 Kashag
 List of rulers of Tibet
 Tibet (1912–51)
 History of Tibet

References

Bibliography 
 
 Tibet: Proving Truth from Facts, Central Tibetan Administration, 1 January 1996.

 
 
 
 
 
 
 
 

 
 
 
 
 

Qing dynasty
History of Tibet
18th century in Tibet
19th century in Tibet
20th century in Tibet
1912 disestablishments in Asia
1720 establishments in China
States and territories established in 1720
China–Tibet relations